In the run up to the next Israeli legislative election, various organisations carried out opinion polling to gauge voting intention in Israel during the term of the twenty-fifth Knesset. This article lists the results of such polls.

The date range for these opinion polls is from the 2022 Israeli legislative election, held on 1 November, to the present day. The election is expected to be held on 2026. In keeping with the election silence tradition, no polls may be published from the end of the Friday before the election until the polling stations close on election day at 22:00.

Polls are listed in reverse chronological order, showing the most recent first and using the dates when the survey fieldwork was done, as opposed to the date of publication. Where the fieldwork dates are unknown, the date of publication is given instead. The highest figure in each polling survey is displayed in bold with its background shaded in the leading party's colour. If a tie ensues, this is applied to the highest figures. When a poll has no information on a certain party, that party is instead marked by a dash (–).

Seat projections 
This section displays voting intention estimates referring to the next Knesset election. The figures listed are Knesset seat counts rather than percentages, unless otherwise stated.

Polling graph 
This graph shows the polling trends from the 2022 Israeli legislative election until the next election day using a 4-poll moving average. Scenario polls are not included here. For parties not crossing the electoral threshold (currently 3.25%) in any given poll, the number of seats is calculated as a percentage of the 120 total seats.

Polls 
Poll results are listed in the table below. Parties that fall below the electoral threshold of 3.25% are denoted by the percentage of votes that they received (N%), rather than the number of seats they would have gotten. 

Legend
 Gov.
 Sum of the 37th government parties: Likud, Religious Zionist Party, Shas and United Torah Judaism. The coalition parties are highlighted in blue. 61 seats are required for a majority in the Knesset. If the government has a majority, the sum is displayed in bold with its background shaded in the leading party's colour.

Scenario polls 
Most often, opinion polling about hypothetical scenarios is done in the same survey as for the regular polling. This is why these scenario polls are paired for comparison purposes.
 

New Anti Judicial Overhaul Right Wing Party'''

Prime Minister

Various candidates

Netanyahu vs. Lapid

Netanyahu vs. Gantz

Approval ratings 
Benjamin Netanyahu

Itamar Ben-Gvir

Bezalel Smotrich

Yoav Galant

Yariv Levin

Yair Lapid

Isaac Herzog

References

next
Israeli